The year 2012 saw a number of significant events in spaceflight. In May and October, the first Commercial Orbital Transportation Services resupply missions took place, during which the SpaceX Dragon became the first private spacecraft to dock with the International Space Station (ISS). In June, China launched the crewed Shenzhou 9 orbital mission, and North Korea achieved its first successful orbital launch in December. 2012 also saw China's first successful asteroid exploration mission, and the landing of NASA's Curiosity rover on Mars. The Vega and Unha-3 rockets made their maiden flights in 2012, while the Proton-K made its last.

A total of 77 orbital launches were attempted in 2012, of which 72 were successful, three were partially successful and two were failures. Five crewed orbital missions were conducted over the course of the year, all successfully, carrying a total of 15 individuals into orbit. The year also saw five EVAs by ISS astronauts. The majority of the year's orbital launches were conducted by Russia, China and the United States, with 29, 19 and 13 launches respectively. A total of 139 payloads were launched during the year, including communication and navigation satellites, logistics spacecraft and scientific probes. Additionally, a large number of suborbital sounding rockets and ballistic missiles were launched by scientific and military organisations.

Overview of orbital spaceflight
A total of 77 orbital launches were attempted in 2012, with 72 being reported as successful, and a total of 139 payloads launched. The three most prolific spacefaring nations were Russia, with 29 launches and 27 successes; China, with 19 launches, all of which succeeded; and the United States, with 13 launches, of which 12 succeeded and one was a partial failure. European nations conducted eight orbital launches, all successfully, while India and Japan conducted two each, also successfully. Iran and North Korea both achieved one successful orbital launch during 2012, but Iran also suffered one launch failures, while North Korea suffered one.

Crewed spaceflight
Five crewed orbital launches were conducted during 2012, all successfully, carrying a total of 15 astronauts into orbit. Four of these missions were flown using Russian Soyuz spacecraft, while the fifth was a Chinese Shenzhou launch. All of the year's crewed missions rendezvoused with space stations – the four Soyuz missions docked with the International Space Station (ISS), while China's Shenzhou 9 docked with the Tiangong-1 orbital laboratory. Five spacewalks were also undertaken in 2012, all by ISS crewmembers.

Robotic exploration
Numerous significant milestones in robotic spaceflight occurred in 2012, including the landing of NASA's Curiosity rover on Mars in August, and the first commercial resupply missions to the ISS in May and October. The latter also marked the first fully operational use of SpaceX's Dragon spacecraft. Elsewhere in the Solar System, NASA's Dawn spacecraft completed its mission to 4 Vesta in September 2012, while China achieved its first asteroid flyby in December.

Orbital launches

|colspan=8 style="background:white;"|

January
|-

|colspan=8 style="background:white;"|

February
|-

|colspan=8 style="background:white;"|

March
|-

|colspan=8 style="background:white;"|

April
|-

|colspan=8 style="background:white;"|

May
|-

|colspan=8 style="background:white;"|

June
|-

|colspan=8 style="background:white;"|

July
|-

|colspan=8 style="background:white;"|

August
|-

|colspan=8 style="background:white;"|

September
|-

|colspan=8 style="background:white;"|

October
|-

|colspan=8 style="background:white;"|

November
|-

|colspan=8 style="background:white;"|

December
|-

|}

Suborbital flights 

|}

Deep space rendezvous

EVAs

Orbital launch statistics

By country
For the purposes of this section, the yearly tally of orbital launches by country assigns each flight to the country of origin of the rocket, not to the launch services provider or the spaceport. For example, Soyuz launches by Arianespace in Kourou are counted under Russia because Soyuz-2 is a Russian rocket.

By rocket

By family

By type

By configuration

By spaceport

By orbit

See also
 2012 in science
 List of human spaceflights, 2011–2020
 Timeline of spaceflight

References

Footnotes

External links
 
 
 

 
Spaceflight by year